Kenneth Peter Zebrowski (November 12, 1945 – March 18, 2007) was a Democratic member of the New York State Assembly.

Early life and education
Born in Brooklyn, New York, Zebrowski received his Juris Doctor degree from the New York Law School in 1970.

Career

Zebrowski served in the Rockland County legislature for 21 years, beginning in 1973 at the age of 29.  He won five four-year terms over the next 31 years.  He was "known as a foe of overdevelopment and a friend of senior citizens".

He was elected to the State Assembly in 2004 for a two-year term (2005–2007).

Zebrowski was diagnosed with hepatitis C and died of liver and kidney failure on March 18, 2007, at the age of 61.

Family
Zebrowski was survived by his wife Linda and six children.

When his son Kenneth Paul Zebrowski graduated from law school, the two men founded the law firm of Zebrowski & Zebrowski. After Zebrowski died, Kenneth Jr. was elected his State Assembly seat.

References

American politicians of Polish descent
1945 births
2007 deaths
Democratic Party members of the New York State Assembly
Politicians from Rockland County, New York
20th-century American politicians